Arianys Argüelles is a Panamanian footballer who plays as a forward. She has been a member of the Panama women's national team.

International career
Argüelles capped for Panama at senior level during the 2014 CONCACAF Women's Championship qualification.

See also
 List of Panama women's international footballers

References

Living people
Panamanian women's footballers
Women's association football forwards
Panama women's international footballers
Year of birth missing (living people)